Dominique Robert (born 1957) is a Canadian writer living in Quebec.

She was born in Hull, Quebec (now Gatineau, Quebec) and grew up in the Outaouais region. She studied literature in Ottawa and studied the teaching of French at the Université du Québec à Montréal. Robert taught French at the secondary school level in Montreal. More recently, she has been an assistant editor at the publishing house . She is a member of the Union des écrivaines et des écrivains québécois.

Selected works 
 Jeux et portraits, poetry (1989)
 Moins malheureux que toi ma mère, stories (1990)
 Jours sans peur, stories (1994)
 Caillou, calcul, poetry (2000), finalist for the  awarded by the magazine Estuaire
 Leçons d'extérieur, poetry (2009)
 Chambre d'amis, novel (2010), received the 
 La cérémonie du Maître, prose (2015), received the

References 

1957 births
Living people
Canadian women poets
Canadian women short story writers
Canadian women novelists
Université du Québec à Montréal alumni
Writers from Gatineau
Canadian poets in French
Canadian short story writers in French
Canadian novelists in French
20th-century Canadian poets
21st-century Canadian poets
20th-century Canadian short story writers
21st-century Canadian short story writers
21st-century Canadian novelists
20th-century Canadian women writers
21st-century Canadian women writers